Baco noir (pronounced BA-koh NWAHR) is a hybrid red wine grape variety produced by Francois Baco from a cross of Vitis vinifera var. Folle blanche, a French wine grape, and an unknown variety of Vitis riparia indigenous to North America.

Regions
In 1951 the variety was brought to the cooler viticulture regions of North America, such as British Columbia, Ontario, Nova Scotia, New York, Michigan, Mississippi, Wisconsin, Pennsylvania and Oregon. In 1955 the variety was brought back to Canada, where the "George" clonal variety is commonly used. Baco noir was the target of a vine-pull program in Canada in the early 1980s, which means that there are few older plots of this variety left in Canada. 

Oregon's first Baco Noir vines were imported by Philippe Girardet in 1971 for his winery located in the Umpqua Valley.

This variety is also grown in certain parts of Colorado as vineyard area expands beyond the traditional AVA's of Colorado and across the Front Range.

See also
 Baco 22A (Baco blanc)

References 

2. BC Baco Noir wineries  

Red wine grape varieties 
Hybrid grape varieties